Portbail (sometimes spelled Port-Bail) is a former commune in the Manche department in north-western France. On 1 January 2019, it was merged into the new commune Port-Bail-sur-Mer.

Heraldry

The arms of Portbail are blazoned :Azure, a chevron abased, between in fess 3 mullets Or and a lancehead argent.

Demography

See also
Communes of the Manche department

References

Former communes of Manche
Populated coastal places in France